Khar is a village development committee (VDC) of Darchula District in the Mahakali Zone  of Far-Western Development Region, Nepal. Geographically khar is located 29.79 N and 80.64 E, its nearest border to the district headquarters is Dallekh which is 10- 12 kilometer north east to the Darchula.  The Khar VDC is surrounded by Sipti and Dhuligada VDC to  the East and South, Katai to the West, and Eyarkot to the North. According to national census 2011 khar VDC has total population 4,272 (2,056 male and 2,216 female) residing 698 households.

Villages of Khar VDC 

 Dallekh
 Chaurigau
 Godhani, Kakanadi, Chaud
 Saalimaad
 Khupuligau, 
 Jamir
 Sundmund

References

1. National Population and Housing Census 2011: Village Development Community/Municipality:https://web.archive.org/web/20130927102414/http://cbs.gov.np/wp-content/uploads/2012/11/VDC_Municipality.pdf

External links
UN map of the municipalities of Darchula District

Populated places in Darchula District